William Fiore (January 1, 1940 – October 3, 2014) was an American television, film and voice actor. Over his lengthy career, he appeared in television shows such as The Mary Tyler Moore Show, Tales from the Darkside, Law & Order and Rocket Power. Fiore was born January 1, 1940, in Williston Park, New York. His first film role was in The Swimmer (1968). 

Aside from television and film work, Fiore also appeared in many television commercials during the 1960s and 1970s, including the “Hi, guy!” Right Guard antiperspirant adverts with actor Chuck McCann, who appeared as his neighbor on the other side of a shared medicine cabinet.

He then provided the voice for the character Darkel in the video game Grand Theft Auto III (2001), and even though his character was cut from the final game, he is still credited in it.

He died on October 3, 2014, in New York City, aged 74.

Filmography

Film

Television

References

External links 

1940 births
2014 deaths
People from Williston Park, New York
20th-century American male actors